Theatre festivals are amongst the earliest types of festival. Classical Greek theatre was associated with religious festivals dedicated to Dionysus, called the City Dionysia. The medieval mystery plays were presented at the major Christian feasts. Theatre as an everyday part of life is a comparatively recent phenomenon.

In recent years, theatre festivals have been established to promote various types of theatre, such as the works of William Shakespeare and George Bernard Shaw. Many festivals, such as those in the fringe theatre movement, promote the work of beginning playwrights (called "new writing") and performers.

This is a list of theatre festivals around the world:

Theatre festivals

References

 List of theatre festivals
Festivals